Aldebaran b is a candidate exoplanet orbiting the orange giant star Aldebaran, 65 light-years away. It was initially detected in 1993, but was considered doubtful until 2015, when researchers came to a conclusion that there is likely an exoplanet orbiting Aldebaran, consistent with the original calculations, but also compatible with stellar activity. However, in 2019, new data placed doubts on its existence again.

Physical properties

Mass and orbit 
Aldebaran b is a giant exoplanet with at least 5.8 times the mass of Jupiter. It orbits at a distance about 45% farther than Earth does from the Sun. Nevertheless, when Aldebaran was a main sequence star, it is likely that the planet had an equilibrium temperature comparable to that of the Earth.

Host star 
The host star, Aldebaran, is an orange giant star, meaning it has moved off from the main sequence and exhausted the supply of hydrogen in the core. It has a spectral class of K5 III.

Aldebaran is a K-type star that is 1.16 ± 0.07 times the mass and 44 times the radius of the Sun. It has a surface temperature of 3,910 K. In comparison, the Sun has a surface temperature of 5778 K. 

The star's average apparent magnitude, or how bright it usually appears from Earth, is 0.86, easily visible to the naked eye.

Discovery

1993 proposal 
The exoplanet was first proposed in 1993, radial velocity measurements of Aldebaran, Arcturus and Pollux showed that Aldebaran exhibited a long-period radial velocity oscillation, which could be interpreted as a substellar companion. However, all three stars surveyed showed similar oscillations yielding similar companion masses, and the authors concluded that the variation was likely to be intrinsic to the star rather than due to the gravitational effect of a companion.

2015 confirmed status
In 2015, a study showed stable long-term evidence for both a planetary companion and stellar activity.

2019 doubts on existence
In 2019, an analysis of additional data provided by Lick Observatory has placed the existence of Aldebaran b in serious doubt, because of apparent phase jitter of radial-velocity signal; a better data fit is obtained by either two planets or no planets at all around Aldebaran.

See also 
Alpha Centauri Bb
Proxima Centauri b
 Hot Jupiter

References

External links 
 Aldebaran b at the Extrasolar Planet Encyclopedia

Aldebaran
Hot Jupiters
Exoplanets discovered in 2015
Taurus (constellation)